Tobias A. Schliessler (born 5 November 1958) is a German cinematographer.

Life and career 
Schliessler was born in Baden-Baden, Germany, to documentary filmmaker and artist Martin Schliessler (1929–2008) and editor Anemone Schliessler (née Heim). His brother, Jochen, is a documentary filmmaker, and his sister, Tina, a film producer, photographer, and painter.

Schiessler grew up in Baden-Baden. In 1979 he moved to Vancouver, British Columbia, Canada and later studied film at the Simon Fraser University. After his graduation as a cinematographer, he started to work on documentary films and advertisement spots. In the late 1980s, he started to work for Canadian television productions. In 1997 he moved to Los Angeles, where he worked on the production of movies like Dreamgirls, Hancock and Battleship. He often works with the directors Bill Condon and Peter Berg. He is a member of the American Society of Cinematographers.

Filmography 
Short film

Feature film

TV movies

References

External links 
 

1958 births
German cinematographers
People from Baden-Baden
Living people
Simon Fraser University alumni
Film people from Baden-Württemberg